Anantapur Assembly constituency was an assembly constituency of the Madras Legislative Assembly till States Reorganisation Act, 1956 Andhra Pradesh Legislative Assembly, India. It was one of constituencies in the Anantapur district.

Overview
It was part of the Anantapur Lok Sabha constituency.

Constituency Details of Anantaptur (Assembly constituency):

Country: India.
 State: Andhra Pradesh.
 District:  Anantapur district.
 Region: Rayalaseema.
 Seat: Unreserved.
 Eligible Electors as per 2019 General Elections:  2,55,682 Eligible Electors. Male Electors:1,26,711. Female Electors:1,28,924.

Members of Legislative Assembly

Madras State
1951: T. Nagi Reddy, Communist Party of India.

Andhra State
1955: P. Anthoni Reddi, Indian National Congress.

Andhra Pradesh

Following is the list of members who got elected from Anantaptur (Assembly constituency) to Andhra Pradesh Legislature till date.

 1962: P. Antony Reddy, Indian National Congress.
 1967: T. Nagi Reddy, Communist Party of India (Marxist).
 1972: Anantha Venkatareddy, Indian National Congress.
 1978: B.T.L.N. Chowary, Indian National Congress (Indira).
 1983: D. Narayanaswamy, Independent.
 1985: N. Ramakrishna, Indian National Congress.
 1989: Bodimalla Narayana Reddy, Telugu Desam Party.
 1994: K. Ramakrishna, Communist Party of India.
 1999: B. Narayana Reddy, Indian National Congress.
 2004: B. Narayana Reddy, Indian National Congress.
 2008 onwards: Anantapur Urban. This Assembly constituency was reformed as Anantapur Urban Assembly constituency and outskirts of this constituency was merged with neighbouring Assembly constituencies.

See also
 List of constituencies of Andhra Pradesh Legislative Assembly

References

Politics of Andhra Pradesh

Former assembly constituencies of Andhra Pradesh